April Maadhathil is a 2002 Indian Tamil-language romantic drama film written and directed by newcomer S. S. Stanley. It stars Srikanth and Sneha, with Gayatri Jayaraman, Venkat Prabhu, Devan and Karunas among others in the supporting cast. The film, which had music scored by Yuvan Shankar Raja and cinematography handled by M. V. Panneerselvam, released on 29 November 2002. The film was later dubbed into Hindi as Mr. Rangeela and in Telugu as Vaallidharu and released in 2004. The film's title is inspired by a song from Vaali.

Plot
It's a story of friendship among eight girls and boys. Kathir is an intelligent guy who grew up in a poor family. His younger brother stopped his education for Kathir. In college, Kathir meets a girl named Shwetha and over time they become friends. Many guys are interested in her, but she finds something different about Kathir. The friends then decide to visit each others homes for their vacation. At Shwetha's home, they learn that Shwetha's father is thinking of getting her married the next year. At graduation, they cut their names on a tree since it is their final year. Though Kathir and Shwetha love each other, they  are unable to express it. The rest of the story is about how they get together.

Cast

 Srikanth as Kathir
 Sneha as Swetha
 Gayatri Jayaraman as  Nirmala ("Nimmi")
 Venkat Prabhu as Venkat ("Venky")
 Devan as Shwetha's father
 Karunas as Cycle Jackson
 Kamala Krishnaswamy as Kathir's mother
 Daniel Balaji as Suresh
 Mayilsamy
 Bava Lakshmanan
 Anju Mahendran as Kathir's friend
 Kottachi
 S. P. Balasubrahmanyam as himself
 Ramakrishnan  as Kathir's friend (uncredited)

Production
S. S. Stanley who had apprenticed with directors Mahendran and Sasi made his directorial debut with this film. It was Srikanth's second film after Rojakoottam.

The film was mostly shot at the YMCA College of Physical Education in Chennai, since a large part of the film plays in a campus, filming was held at locations in Chennai, Bangalore, Mysore, Ooty and Visakhapatnam.

Release
After the success, S. S. Stanley and Srikanth again collaborated with films like Kizhakku Kadalkarai Salai and Mercury Pookal which failed to replicate the success of their first collaboration.

Critical reception
The Hindu wrote: "Stanley who heads [sic] direction, deserves special mention for a very decent handling of romance."

Soundtrack

The soundtrack, which released on 6 October 2002, was composed by Yuvan Shankar Raja, who himself had sung one of the songs. Opera singer Shekhina Shawn Jazeel sang one song under the name Prasanna. The soundtrack features 6 songs with lyrics written by five different lyricists, Pazhani Bharathi, Pa. Vijay, Thamarai, Na. Muthukumar and Snehan. The song "Bailomo Bailomo" originally composed for this film was used in Shaam starrer Bala.

References

External links
 

2002 films
2002 romantic drama films
2000s Tamil-language films
Indian romantic drama films
Indian coming-of-age drama films
Films scored by Yuvan Shankar Raja
Films set in universities and colleges
Films shot in Chennai
Films shot in Bangalore
Films shot in Mysore
Films shot in Ooty
Films shot in Visakhapatnam
Films about friendship
2000s coming-of-age drama films
2002 directorial debut films
Films directed by S. S. Stanley